Concert Properties Ltd. (which is related to Concert Real Estate Corporation) is a Canadian real estate company based in Vancouver, British Columbia. It is owned by 19 union and management pension funds and its commercial assets are valued at over $8 billion.

Concert Properties is the largest developer of rental housing in Western Canada, with properties in the Greater Toronto Area, Metropolitan Vancouver and Victoria, British Columbia, including 7,600 homes, 500,000 square feet of commercial space, 18 police facilities in Ontario, and three Tapestry retirement communities. The company has also built 22 schools in Alberta and 18 in Saskatchewan.

The current chief executive officer (CEO) and President of Concert Properties is David Podmore.

History 
The Vancouver Land Corporation was co-founded in 1989 by Jack W. Poole and David R. Podmore to develop economically priced rental housing in British Columbia. The company's name was later changed to Greystone Properties, and then to its current name, Concert Properties. The company was created jointly by the Provincial government, the City of Vancouver, and 26 union pension funds.

Some media reports in 2005 indicated that Jack Poole planned for the Concert to bid on some Olympic Games infrastructure projects, but Poole abandoned these plans due to negative media coverage. He later died of cancer at the age of 76.

In 2017, David Podmore stepped down as CEO of Concert and was replaced by Brian McCauley. McCauley left the company in 2022 and Podmore took over as Chair, President and CEO. In June 2017, Concert paid RioCan, another real estate company, $26.3 million for a 50% interest in Toronto's oldest strip plaza, the Sunnybrook Plaza. The two companies planned to collaborate on its redevelopment.

In 2018, Concert announced they would be redeveloping Coquitlam Park into 8 buildings comprising up to 2,600 housing units. The City of Coquitlam will cover half the costs, and the first phase is expected to be completed by 2023. Many Coquitlam residents have expressed concern over the project and want the park to remain unchanged.

References 

1989 establishments in Canada
Real estate companies of Canada
Investment companies of Canada
Companies based in Vancouver
Home builders
1989 establishments in British Columbia
Real estate companies established in 1989
Financial services companies based in British Columbia